Lípa is a municipality and village in Havlíčkův Brod District in the Vysočina Region of the Czech Republic. It has about 1,200 inhabitants.

Administrative parts
Villages of Chválkov, Dobrohostov and Petrkov are administrative parts of Lípa.

History
The first written mention of Lípa is from 1351.

Notable people
Bohuslav Reynek (1892–1971), poet, writer, painter and translator

References

Villages in Havlíčkův Brod District